The 1952 Cupa României Final was the 15th final of Romania's most prestigious football cup competition. It was disputed between CCA București and Flacăra Ploieşti, and was won by CCA București after a game with 2 goals. It was the fourth cup title, all in row, in the history of CCA București.

Match details

See also 
List of Cupa României finals

References

External links
Romaniansoccer.ro

1952
Cupa
Romania